Brian Jeffrey Averell (born November 26, 1979 in Camden, New Jersey) is an American actor and reality show contestant who won The Amazing Race 9 with teammate Tyler MacNiven. He is currently a CBS technology reporter and Periscope livestreamer broadcasting from all the major content conventions such as NAB.

Early life and education 
A native of Collingswood, New Jersey, Averell graduated from Collingswood High School in 1998, and attended Harvard University. In 2000, he ran for Undergraduate Council president. Considered a wildcard, Averell was twice cited with campaign violations before being forced to shut down his campaign.

At Harvard, Averell was a member of the Hasty Pudding Theatricals and the improv group On Thin Ice.  He also wrote daily comic strip "The Neil World" for The Harvard Crimson.  With fellow Harvard student B. J. Novak, he co-produced and hosted a variety show called "The B.J. Show," which one year featured Bob Saget reprising his television roles in a few skits and ending the show with his own standup routine.  He would eventually graduate with a degree in religion, and move to Los Angeles to pursue a career in entertainment.

Logan Airport incident 
On November 24, 1999, Averell showed up late for a 6:15 p.m. flight from Logan International Airport in Boston to Philadelphia aboard a Delta Connection commuter flight, and was denied access to the small jet because his assigned seat had been given away.  Averell slipped past the attendant at the gate, blended in with other passengers crossing the tarmac and proceeded to find refuge in a rest room and settled onto a toilet seat.  "Once I got on, I figured maybe through some stroke of fate no one would have to use the bathroom," Averell said.  He was given away by another passenger and arrested before the flight departed.  He was charged with disorderly conduct and trespassing. He later told a news photographer he was surprised at how easy it was to stow away.

Averell pleaded not guilty, and two months later state prosecutors and Delta Air Lines agreed to drop all charges against him.  According to Averell’s lawyer, the decision came because the then student "was not belligerent to anyone".

The Amazing Race 

In 2006, Averell appeared as a contestant on the ninth edition of the American television series The Amazing Race. He and his teammate, Tyler MacNiven, whom Averell met during  Semester at Sea four years earlier, beat out ten other teams to win the show's $1 million prize. B.J. & Tyler, as they were identified on the program, were nicknamed "the hippies" by the other teams.

B.J. & Tyler came in last in two legs of the season, but luckily both legs were non-elimination legs.  Host Phil Keoghan said, "They enjoyed every single moment they were on this race, whether they were in first or in last. They kept their spirit all the way to the end."  "If it’s this successful to be hippies, we might as well stay hippies," Tyler said at the finish line in Denver, Colorado. B. J. added, "I think that on this Race, being cerebral or being intelligent doesn't help as much as being in the moment and just being aware of what's going on around you.  And it's just great to stay positive and just really enjoy each other's company. And our friendship is what got us through it."

The Amazing Race 9 finishes

An  placement with a double-dagger indicates that BJ and Tyler were the last to arrive at a pit stop in a non-elimination leg.
A  indicates that BJ and Tyler won the Fast Forward.

Roadblocks performed by Averall are bolded 

Notes

Acting 
 In 2005, BJ played the part of an escaped criminal in the movie Saving Shiloh.
 Also in 2005, BJ appeared in the 4th episode of CSI'''s 6th season. He played a member of a cult that committed suicide in the episode titled "Shooting Stars."
 In 2010, BJ appeared as a beer vendor in the 9th episode of Weeds's 6th season, entitled "To Moscow, and Quickly."
 Introduced himself as Bingo on Control TV while crashing on Tristan Couvares's loft as a "couch surfer".
 In 2017, BJ appeared as himself in a Pedestrian Question segment of Jimmy Kimmel Live''.

References 

1979 births
Collingswood High School alumni
The Harvard Crimson people
Living people
People from Collingswood, New Jersey
Reality show winners
The Amazing Race (American TV series) contestants
Hasty Pudding alumni